"Can't Fight this Feeling" is a song written by Junior Caldera, Sophie Ellis-Bextor and Roselyn Della Sabina, and produced by Junior Caldera for his first album, Début, released in 2009. It was released as the album's fourth single in February 2010. It was also the second single from Ellis-Bextor's fourth studio album, Make A Scene. The single was released in France prior to the release of Ellis-Bextor following single, "Bittersweet". The video for the song was shot in Paris on 10 March 2010. It was believed that Roselyn Della Sabina stopped writing for Madonna to complete this song. The single was released in Australia on 26 March 2011.

Track listing
 Digital Download - The Remixes Part 1
"Can't Fight this Feeling" (Radio Edit)
"Can't Fight this Feeling" (Junior Moonlight Remix)
"Can't Fight this Feeling" (Mischa Daniels Radio Edit)
"Can't Fight this Feeling" (Soundshakerz Radio Edit)
"Can't Fight this Feeling" (Junior Caldera Remix Radio Edit)

 Digital Download - The Remixes Part 2
"Can't Fight this Feeling" (Original Mix)
"Can't Fight this Feeling" (Soulshakerz Club Extended Mix)
"Can't Fight this Feeling" (Avicii Universe Mix)
"Can't Fight this Feeling" (Junior Caldera Remix)
"Can't Fight this Feeling" (Mischa Daniels Original Mix)

 CD Single
"Can't Fight this Feeling" (Album Version) – 3:35
"Can't Fight this Feeling" (Junior Caldera Remix Radio Edit) – 3:49
"Can't Fight this Feeling" (Soundshakerz Radio Edit) – 3:58
"Can't Fight this Feeling" (Avicii Universe Mix) – 6:42

 Maxi Single
"Can't Fight this Feeling" (Avicii Universe Mix) – 6:42
"Can't Fight this Feeling" (Original Mix)
"Can't Fight this Feeling" (Soundshakerz Radio Edit) – 3:58
"Can't Fight this Feeling" (Soulshakerz Club Mix) - 7:31
"Can't Fight this Feeling" (Junior Caldera Remix Radio Edit) – 3:49
"Can't Fight this Feeling" (Junior Caldera Club Mix) – 5:42
"Can't Fight this Feeling" (Mischa Daniels Original Mix) - 6:53
"Can't Fight this Feeling" (Junior Moonlight Remix) - 3:03

Charts

Weekly charts

Year-end charts

Release history

Notes
 A ^ Released as part of the Clubland 18 compilation. Available to purchase on iTunes.

References

2010 singles
Number-one singles in Poland
Songs written by Sophie Ellis-Bextor
Songs written by Junior Caldera
2009 songs
Number-one singles in Russia